Women's discus throw events for athletes with cerebral palsy were held at the 2004 Summer Paralympics in the Athens Olympic Stadium. Events were held in three disability classes or ranges, F32-34 being held jointly with 51-53 wheelchair athletes.

F32-34/51-53

F35/36/38

The F35/36/38 event was won by Veronika Foltova, representing .

19 Sept. 2004, 17:00

F37

The F37 event was won by Li Chun Hua, representing .

20 Sept. 2004, 09:00

References

W
2004 in women's athletics